The 1970–71 season was PAOK Football Club's 45th in existence and the club's 12th consecutive season in the top flight of Greek football. The team entered the Greek Football Cup in first round.

Players

Squad

Transfers
Players transferred in

Players transferred out

Kit

Pre-season

Competitions

Overview

Managerial statistics

Alpha Ethniki

Standings

Results summary

Results by round

Matches

Greek Cup

Round of 32

Round of 16

Quarter-finals

Semi-finals

Final

Inter-Cities Fairs Cup

First round

Statistics

Squad statistics

! colspan="13" style="background:#DCDCDC; text-align:center" | Goalkeepers
|-

! colspan="13" style="background:#DCDCDC; text-align:center" | Defenders
|-

! colspan="13" style="background:#DCDCDC; text-align:center" | Midfielders
|-

! colspan="13" style="background:#DCDCDC; text-align:center"| Forwards
|-

|}	

Source: Match reports in competitive matches, rsssf.com

Goalscorers

Source: Match reports in competitive matches, rsssf.com

External links
 www.rsssf.com
 PAOK FC official website

References 

PAOK FC seasons
PAOK